Thomas Sumner may refer to:

 Thomas Hubbard Sumner (1807–1876), sea captain known for developing a celestial navigation method
 Thomas Waldron Sumner (1768–1849), architect and government representative in Boston, Massachusetts